Arbatskaya is a station on the Filyovskaya line of the Moscow Metro. Completed in 1935, it was one of the original Metro stations. The pillars are faced with pinkish marble and the platform is a matching shade of granite. The walls are covered with cream-colored ceramic tile. The architect was L. Teplitskiy

Arbatskaya's vestibule is a unique five-tiered, pentagonal structure with the word "Metro" written on all sides. The building is currently painted bright red, making it noticeable and instantly recognizable.

Gallery

In popular culture

Moscow Metro stations
Railway stations in Russia opened in 1935
Filyovskaya Line
Railway stations located underground in Russia